The Otis Putnam House is a historic house at 25 Harvard Street in Worcester, Massachusetts. Built in 1887 to a design by Fuller & Delano for a prominent local department store owner, it is a fine local example of Queen Anne architecture executed in brick. The house was listed on the National Register of Historic Places in 1980.  It now houses offices.

Description and history

The Putnam House is located on the west side of Harvard Street, a north–south road paralleling downtown Worcester's Main Street on a rise to the west, southwest of its corner with Dix Street, and adjacent to the Jerome Marble House. It is a -story brick building, with a front-facing gable roof and a stone foundation. It is roughly rectangular in plan, with asymmetrical projecting sections to the sides. On its east-facing front facade, a two-story porch is recessed under the gable, with the first-floor section projecting beyond, with a shed roof across part of its width, and a gable above the granite steps. The second-floor porch has turned posts set on shingled piers, with a latticework frieze between them at the top. The main gable is framed in wood and finished in shingles set in a wavy pattern, with a projecting bay at the center with two round-arch windows in the front. First-floor windows are set in segmented-arch openings capped by brick lintels, while second floor windows are in square openings with stone lintels. A band of decorative brickwork acts as a frieze below the roofline.

The house was built in 1887 to a design by Fuller & Delano, and is one of the city's finer examples of Queen Anne brickwork. It was built for Otis Putnam, a native of nearby Leicester who worked his way through the ranks to become a leading partner in one of the city's largest department stores. He also served as a director of the local electric company, and of the Worcester and Holden Street Railway Company.

See also
National Register of Historic Places listings in northwestern Worcester, Massachusetts
National Register of Historic Places listings in Worcester County, Massachusetts

References

Houses in Worcester, Massachusetts
Queen Anne architecture in Massachusetts
Houses completed in 1887
National Register of Historic Places in Worcester, Massachusetts
Houses on the National Register of Historic Places in Worcester County, Massachusetts
1887 establishments in Massachusetts